There are at least 37 named lakes and reservoirs in Hempstead County, Arkansas.

Lakes
	1916 Cut-off, el.  
	1940 Cut-off Lake, el.  
	Beard Lake, el.  
	Bois d'Arc Lake, el.  
	Bushy Lake, el.  
	Clear Lake, el.  
	Cypress Lake, el.  
	Duck Pond, el.  
	First Old River Lake, el.  
	Fish Lake, el.  
	Horseshoe Lake, el.  
	Lake Vaughn, el.  
	Lower Red Lake, el.  
	Mud Lake, el.  
	Old River Lake, el.  
	Red Lake, el.  
	Red Lake, el.

Reservoirs
	Bridewells Lake, el.  
	Catfish Pond, el.  
	Erwin Lake, el.  
	H and P Lake, el.  
	Hawg Pond, el.  
	Lake Harris, el.  
	Millwood Lake, el.  
	North Fork Ozan Creek Watershed Site Reservoir, el.  
	North Fork Ozan Creek Watershed Site Reservoir, el.  
	Porter Lake, el.  
	Rocky Mound Pond, el.  
	Rolling Hills Pond, el.  
	Royston Lake One, el.  
	Royston Lake Three, el.  
	Royston Lake Two, el.  
	Smith Lake, el.  
	Sow Pond, el.  
	Stanley Lake Number One, el.  
	Stanley Lake Number Two, el.  
	Wino Lake, el.

See also

 List of lakes in Arkansas

Notes

Bodies of water of Hempstead County, Arkansas
Hempstead